Little Albro Lake  is a lake of Halifax Regional Municipality, Nova Scotia, Canada in the community of Dartmouth. Little Albro Lake has a plant named the yellow floating heart that is Invasive to the area.

See also
List of lakes in Nova Scotia

References
 National Resources Canada
 Invasive plant killing Dartmouth lake

Lakes of Nova Scotia